Saint-Fiacre is a commune in the Seine-et-Marne department in the Île-de-France region in north-central France.

It is named after Saint Fiacre who built a hospice for travelers at the end of the 6th century in what is now Saint-Fiacre, Seine-et-Marne. He is still revered as the patron saint of Saint-Fiacre.

In the late medieval song "Le Roy Engloys", Saint-Fiacre en Brie, Brie being the region the town is located in, is mentioned as the place where the English King Henry V died. This is incorrect, however, as the king died at Vincennes.

See also
Communes of the Seine-et-Marne department

References

External links

1999 Land Use, from IAURIF (Institute for Urban Planning and Development of the Paris-Île-de-France région) 

Communes of Seine-et-Marne